At the 8th National Games of the People's Republic of China, the athletics events were held in Shanghai in October 1997.

These games were marred by numerous doping affairs.

Guangxi runners Chen Xuehui (the 800m silver medalist), Jiang Limei (the 400m hurdles champion) and Peng Yinghua (the 400m hurdles silver medalist) were later disqualified for doping. Sichuan long jumper Xiong Qiying, the long jump event winner, was also tested positive.

Medal summary

Men's events

Women's events

Results

Women

100 m
Held on October 17–18.

After having clocking 10.90 seconds in the heats (setting a new area record in the process), Sichuan's Li Xuemei easily won her semi-final before smashing her record in a high-level final with a time of 10.79 seconds.

Her teammate Liu Xiaomei, who had won the event four years before,  took the silver medal in a personal best time of 10.89 seconds.

Guangxi twice Olympian veteran Tian Yumei finished third with a time of 11.06 seconds; equaling her personal best she had set in the semi-finals.

Nineteen-year-old Xiao Lin from Sichuan broke the Asian junior record three times. She came to Shanghai with a personal best of 11.29 seconds set in Chengdu that year and improved it to 11.22 in the heats, then to 11.20 in the semi-finals and finally to 11.17 in the final.

Semi-finals
First 4 of each heat (Q) qualified for the final.

Final

200 m

Held on October 21–22. Chen Yuxiang from Shandong set a new Asian junior record of 22.83 seconds in the heats and advanced to the semi-finals.

Semi-finals
First 4 of each heat (Q) qualified for the final.

Final

400 m
Held on October 17–18.

The final was won by Liaoning 17-year-old Li Jing in an astonishing time of 50.01 seconds. She beat Grit Breuer's world youth record of 50.48 seconds set in 1989 in the process.

Guangdong Du Xiujie and Shandong Chen Yuxiang finished respectively second and third. 
Zhang Hengyun, from Jiangsu, who had finished second in the event four years before; crossed the line in fourth place, recording despite all a new personal best.

Heats

Final

800 m
Held between October 21–22.

Heats
First 2 of each heat (Q) and the next 2 fastest (q) qualified for the final.

Final

1500 m
Held on October 17–18. It primarily consisted of Liaoning runners.

Qu Yunxia was expected to break the 3:50 bar according to her coach, Ma Junren. However, she fell during the final and only finished eighth. Her 20-year-old teammate Jiang Bo eventually won the race, clocking 3:50.98, the second fastest time ever.  It remains one of three times under 3:51.  Less than a half second behind her, barely 18 year old Lang Yinglai set the still standing World Junior Record, breaking the previous record by Lan Lixin set in the qualifying round.  In fifth place, 16 year old Zhang Ling set the still standing World Youth Best.  At the conclusion of this race, the top six all were in the top 12 in history (plus Qu in eight place still the world record holder).  Since this race, only Genzebe Dibaba has run faster than any of them.

Heats
First 5 of each heat (Q) and the next 4 fastest (q) qualified for the final.

Final

10,000 m
Held on October 19.
Final

100 m hurdles
Held on October 17–18.

Heats

Final

400 m hurdles
Held on October 21–22.

Jiang Limei and Peng Yinghua, both from Guangxi had respectively won the gold and the silver medals but were later disqualified after failing a doping test.

Heats
First 2 of each heat (Q) and the next 2 fastest (q) qualified for the final.

4 × 400 m relay
Held on October 23.
Final

 The Guangxi team was later disqualified after the hurdlers Peng Yinghua, Jiang Limei and the 800 m runner Chen Xuehui failed a doping test. Jiangsu was awarded the gold medal and Sichuan, which originally finished fourth took the bronze medal.

Heptathlon
Held on October 17–18, after a three years break, Zhejiang Chinese record holder Ma Miaolan won her second consecutive National Games title, winning the event with a total of 6236 points. Her 16-year-old teammate Shen Shengfei set a new World youth record to finish second, beating Sichuan's Liu Xin by only one point.

References

General
1997 Athletics World Rankings Lists. Tilastopaja. Retrieved on 2013-03-29.
8th National Games medallists . jx918. Retrieved on 2013-03-29.

External links
Athlestats2010.izihost.com

1997
Chinese Games
Athletics